Brigadier James Thomas Burrows  (13 July 1904 – 10 June 1991) was a New Zealand teacher, sportsman, administrator, and military leader. He was born in Prebbleton, New Zealand, on 13 July 1904. Following his education at Christchurch Boys' High School, he became a teacher. He graduated from Canterbury College in 1935 with a master's thesis titled A comparison between the early colonisations of New Zealand and America. 

As a rugby union player, Burrows was a hooker. He represented  in 1923 and from 1925 to 1930. He was a member of the New Zealand national side, the All Blacks, on their first ever tour of South Africa in 1928. On that tour he played in nine matches and scored two tries, but he did not appear in any of the Tests. He was sole selector and coach of the Canterbury team from 1932 to 1933, and manager–coach for the All Blacks in their 1937 test series against South Africa.

Burrows also played nine first-class matches for the Canterbury cricket team in the Plunket Shield. An opening bowler, he took 4 for 24 when Canterbury dismissed Auckland for 56 in 1931–32. Batting customarily at number eleven, he had the unusual record of never being dismissed in any of his 12 innings.

A Territorial Force officer, Burrows volunteered for overseas service during the Second World War.  Serving in Greece, Crete, North Africa and Italy, he rose to the rank of brigadier. He was made a Companion of the Distinguished Service Order (DSO) in 1942, and awarded a bar to the DSO in 1944.

Leaving the army in 1944, he became rector of Waitaki Boys' High School. He resigned this position in 1949 and rejoined the Army, serving as commander of the New Zealand force in Korea in 1953. In 1953, Burrows was awarded the Queen Elizabeth II Coronation Medal.

Burrows published an autobiography covering his experiences in the war, Pathway Among Men, in 1974.

Burrows died in Christchurch on 10 June 1991.

References

External links
Generals of World War II

1904 births
1991 deaths
New Zealand military personnel
New Zealand international rugby union players
People educated at Christchurch Boys' High School
New Zealand brigadiers
New Zealand military personnel of World War II
New Zealand military personnel of the Korean War
New Zealand cricketers
Canterbury cricketers
New Zealand educators
New Zealand Commanders of the Order of the British Empire
New Zealand Companions of the Distinguished Service Order
New Zealand rugby union players
Canterbury rugby union players
Rugby union hookers
University of Canterbury alumni
New Zealand rugby union coaches
New Zealand national rugby union team coaches
Heads of schools in New Zealand